Piercing migration is the process that occurs when a body piercing moves from its initial location. This process can be painful or go unnoticed, until it has progressed.  Given enough time, a ring may migrate entirely outside of the skin, although it may only migrate a small amount and come to rest.

Potential causes and effects of migration
The effects of migration can vary widely. The most common form of migration is the way that heavy small gauge earrings will migrate downwards out of the earlobe, as is common in older women who have worn earrings most of their lives. This is known as the "cheesecutter effect", as its action is easily compared to the method of cutting cheese with a fine wire. Contemporary body and ear piercing jewelry is much more balanced in its weight to gauge ratio, although migration is still possible with heavy jewelry, even if it is of large gauge.

Play or movement of the area pierced or implanted can also lead to migration, but it's not likely. Sometimes this can occur without an open wound being created, as the fistula stretches in one direction, and tissue fills in behind it. This is not uncommon with tongue piercings, although the migration usually stops before the jewelry would exit the body.

Damage to the tissue surrounding the piercing can also cause migration. A damaged piercing, much like a fresh piercing, must heal the fistula that it passes through, and the jewelry may start migrating in the direction of the wound, further damaging the fistula as it moves. Should the fistula heal, the migration may stop, although it may be inclined to continue migrating, as the re-healed area of tissue may not be as strong as the original fistula was.

Migration may also be caused by the body rejecting the material that the jewelry is made of. Like a case of a splinter or other foreign object, the body will try to push out foreign material, especially if it irritates the surrounding tissue. Contemporary body jewelry is made from surgical grade implant materials, so with proper aftercare during the healing phase and good hygiene, this is rare.

Pressure, especially the pressure caused by improperly performed surface, navel, and eyebrow piercings often leads to migration. Proper, custom made jewelry can reduce the risk of migration associated with these piercings, although it cannot eliminate it. This type of migration is sometimes accompanied by rejection due to improper drainage due to the length of piercing, as dead tissue builds up in the healing fistula.

Rejection rate
Rejection rate is a term used by the piercing industry. It applies to the chance of a piercing being forced out by the body. This is a body's natural reaction to a foreign object being inserted into the skin. This behavior can be witnessed with other objects such as splinters, road rash, or infections. With surface piercings being closer to the surface of the skin, the tendency to reject is higher, as it is easier for the body to force the jewelry out.

Surface piercing rejection rates

Surface piercings, such as a navel piercing, Christina piercing, eyebrow piercing, or a nape piercing, tend to have a higher rejection rate than piercings that pass through a deeper area of flesh or have holes on the opposite side of each other. Thus surface piercings stand in contrast to piercings such as tongue piercing, earrings, or nose piercings.

References

Body piercing